Valerie Campbell-Harding (May 3, 1932 – October 5, 2006) was an experimental textile art designer and author of 24 books.

Biography
She was born in Canada on May 3, 1932 and died in England on October 5, 2006. She founded the Computer Textile Design Group in 1996, a group whose focus was the application of computer technologies to textiles. Campbell-Harding was also editor and frequent contributor to the Computer Textile Design Group magazine Design IT. Valerie Campbell-Harding taught City & Guilds Embroidery, Decorated Textiles and Machine Embroidery and weekend courses and workshops on embroidery, beading, digital photography and computer design for textiles all over the world (in particular Britain, America and Australia) between 1980 and her death. She was the editor of The World of Embroidery, the author or co-author of more than twenty books on embroidery, design and beading (often with Maggie Grey, Pamela Watts or Jane Lemon) and made a video on bead embroidery with Pam Watts.

Training
 Chippenham Technical College.
 Goldsmith's Art College.
 Loughborough Art College.
 Nottingham University (Adult Teaching Certificate).
 Open College of the Arts/Creative Digital Arts.
 Open College of the Arts/The Art of Photography.

Teaching
 City & Guilds Embroidery 790 parts 1 & 2 at:
 Newbury Technical College, Berkshire 1982–1989.
 Chippenham Technical College Wiltshire 1982–1991. 					
 Urchfont Manor College, Wiltshire 1982–1998.
 Missenden Abbey Adult Education College 1991–1998.
 Preparing Working Designs for C & G Creative Studies at Newbury Technical College  1988–1989.
 City & Guilds 7802 Textile Decoration 1998–2000.
 City & Guilds 7802 Automatic Decorative Stitches 2000–2001.
 Colour and Design Certificate Courses at Urchfont Manor College.
 Colour and Design Correspondence Course for Urchfont Manor College.
 City & Guilds 7802 Machine Embroidery 2000–2006.
 City & Guild 7900 Machine Embroidery 2002–2006.
 Open College Network course in Passementerie 1995–1997. (Wrote the syllabus for the OCN 1996/7) Missenden Abbey.
 Open College Network  course in Machine Embroidery 1996–1998. (Wrote the syllabus for the OCN 1996/7) Missenden Abbey.
 Weekends at Residential Adult Education Colleges including West Dean College, Missenden Abbey, Alston Hall, Dillington, Hawkwood College, Fittleworth College, Dartington, Springfield Court, Horncastle College, Bellerby College, Forge Mill, Masterclass at Colchester, Wye College, Belstead House, Kingcombe, the Earnley Concourse and Denman College.
 Courses at Art Colleges, and Adult Education Centres, and for the Embroiderers' Guild at Hampton Court and Branches all over the UK.
 Summer Schools at Missenden Abbey, Masterclass, Rose Barn, Lichfield College, Embroiderers Guild at Hampton Court, Churchfields Swindon, and Various E. Guild regional summer schools.
 Courses at Threads '90 (the Bradford Festival) and the Great British Bead Show 1996.
 In-Service courses for art teachers in Berkshire, Wiltshire, Kent & Norfolk, and for Network Training.
 Teaching tours of Australia, Scotland, USA, Jersey, the Isle of Wight, Ireland, Guernsey and the Isle of Man.
 Started the Computer Textile Design Group in 1992, and was the President and Editor of the Newsletter until her death in 2006. Demonstrated, exhibited and taught courses on computer design for the Group to craftsmen and teachers.

Publications
 Textures in Embroidery, Batsford.
 Patchwork 1 and 2  (co-author), Search Press.
 Faces And Figures in Embroidery, Batsford.
 Strip Patchwork, Batsford.
 Goldwork, Search Press.
 Every Kind of Patchwork (co-author), Pan.
 Flowers and Plants in Embroidery, Batsford.
 Gold & Silver Embroidery (3 sections), Search Press.
 Weaving with Ribbons, David & Charles.
 Machine Embroidery: Stitch Techniques (co-author), Batsford.
 Fabric Painting for Embroidery, Batsford.
 Embroidery Studio (2 chapters), David & Charles.
 Bead Embroidery (co-author), Batsford.
 Machine Embroidery: Stitched Patterns, Batsford.
 The Machine Embroidery Workbook (co-author), Embroiderers’ Guild.
 Beaded Tassels, Braids & Fringes, Sterling.
 Colour & Design Workbook, CTDG.
 Machine Embroidery: Layers of Stitch (co-author), Batsford.
 Fabulous Filters Workbook, CTDG.
 Celtic Inspiration for Machine Embroidery (co-author), Batsford.
 Stitching the Edge, Batsford (2004).
 Using a Digital Camera Workbook, CTDG (Oct 2003).

Work as editor
 Starting to Stitch Creatively, Batsford.
 The World of Embroidery 1988–1996.
 Beadworkers Guild Journal 1999–2000.
 Computer Textile Design Group Magazine Design-IT 1992–2006.
 Personal interviews in Workbox, The World of Embroidery, Workshop on the Web and Stitches.
 Profile lecture at the V & A 2005.
 Articles in Workshop on the Web, Workbox, The World of Embroidery, The Textile Directory, Stitch, The Beadworkers' Guild Journal and Bead&Button.

Also
 Consultant on embroidery books to B T Batsford, 1990–1995.
 BBC TV appearances during 1975 and 1995.
 ITV appearances in February and October 2000.
 Video on Bead Embroidery  (with Pam Watts), Find a Fact, 1995.
 Demonstrated at the Knitting and Stitching Show in London and Dublin, and the Madeira show in Harrogate, and the National Patchwork Championships, the D&T Show, at exhibitions and smaller shows.

Exhibitions
 Commonwealth Institute, London.
 Foyle's Art Gallery London.
 Embroiderers' Guild Hampton Court.
 South Hill Park Arts Centre, Bracknell, Berkshire.
 Ideal Home Exhibition.
 Newbury Festival.
 Salisbury Cathedral.
 Hereford Cathedral.
 Art in Action, Waterperry House, Salisbury, Windsor and Loughborough Art Colleges.
 Commissioned work in private collections, and at Radley College, Abingdon.

References

1932 births
2006 deaths
20th-century Canadian women artists
21st-century Canadian women artists
Artists from Toronto
Canadian textile artists
Textile designers
Women textile artists
Embroiderers